The 1945 British Columbia general election was the 21st general election in the Province of British Columbia, Canada. It was held to elect members of the Legislative Assembly of British Columbia. The election was called on August 31, 1945, and held on October 25, 1945.  The new legislature met for the first time on February 21, 1946.

A centre-right coalition was formed by the Liberal and Conservative parties in order to defeat the social democratic Co-operative Commonwealth Federation.

Although the Coalition won fewer votes than the Liberal and Conservative parties won in total in the previous election, the Coalition still won over half of the votes, and was able to form a majority government.

Results

Notes:

* Party did not nominate candidates in the previous election.

1 Compared to Liberal + Conservative total from previous election

2 Various groups joined forces under the Social Credit name to contest the election.

3 Thomas Dufferin Pattullo (Prince Rupert), former premier and Liberal Party leader, ran as an Independent, and is included as such.

4 Includes L.H. MacQueen (Saanich), classified as an Independent PC since the Progressive Conservative Party, formerly the Conservative Party, was officially running as part of the Coalition and did not consider MacQueen as a legitimate party candidate.

Results by riding

|-
||    
|align="center"  |James Mowat
|align="center"  |Alberni<small>Coalition
||    
||    
|align="center"  |Burnaby<small>Co-operative Commonwealth Fed.
|align="center"  |Ernest Edward Winch
||    
|-
||    
|align="center"  |William Duncan Smith
|align="center"  |Atlin<small>Coalition
||    
||    
|align="center"  |Cowichan-Newcastle<small>Co-operative Commonwealth Fed.
|align="center"  |Samuel Guthrie
||    
|-
||    
|align="center"  |Louis LeBourdais
|align="center"  |Cariboo<small>Coalition
||    
||    
|align="center"  |Fort George<small>Co-operative Commonwealth Fed.
|align="center"  |John McInnis
||    
|-
||    
|align="center"  |Leslie Harvey Eyres
|align="center"  |Chilliwack<small>Coalition
||    
||    
|align="center"  |Kaslo-Slocan<small>Co-operative Commonwealth Fed.
|align="center"  |Randolph Harding
||    
|-
||    
|align="center"  |Thomas King
|align="center"  |Columbia<small>Coalition
||    
||    
|align="center"  |Mackenzie<small>Co-operative Commonwealth Fed.
|align="center"  |Herbert Gargrave
||    
|-
||    
|align="center"  |Herbert John Welch
|align="center"  |Comox<small>Coalition
||    
||    
|align="center"  |Omineca<small>Co-operative Commonwealth Fed.
|align="center"  |Edward Fraser Rowland
||    
|-
||    
|align="center"  |Frank William Green
|align="center"  |Cranbrook<small>Coalition
||    
||    
|align="center"  |Peace River<small>Co-operative Commonwealth Fed.
|align="center"  |Joseph Hardcastle Corsbie
||    
|-
||    
|align="center"  |Alexander Campbell Hope
|align="center"  |Delta<small>Coalition
||    
||    
|align="center"  |Prince Rupert<small>Co-operative Commonwealth Fed.
|align="center"  |William Henry Brett
||    
|-
||    
|align="center"  |Roderick Charles MacDonald
|align="center"  |Dewdney<small>Coalition
||    
||    
|align="center" rowspan=2 |Vancouver East<small>Co-operative Commonwealth Fed.
|align="center"  |Arthur James Turner
||    
|-
||    
|align="center"  |Charles Taschereau Beard
|align="center"  |Esquimalt<small>Coalition
||    
||    
|align="center"  |Harold Edward Winch2
||    
|-
||    
|align="center"  |Thomas Alfred Love
|align="center"  |Grand Forks-Greenwood<small>Coalition
||    
||    
|align="center"  |Fernie<small>Labour (Independent)
|align="center"  |Tom Uphill
||    
|-
||    
|align="center"  |Robert Henry Carson
|align="center"  |Kamloops<small>Coalition
||    
|-
||    
|align="center"  |Ernest Crawford Carson
|align="center"  |Lillooet<small>Coalition
||    
|-
||    
|align="center"  |George Sharratt Pearson
|align="center"  |Nanaimo and the Islands<small>Coalition
||    
|-
||    
|align="center"  |Frank Putnam
|align="center"  |Nelson-Creston<small>Coalition
||    
|-
||    
|align="center"  |Byron Ingemar Johnson
|align="center"  |New Westminster<small>Coalition
||    
|-
||    
|align="center"  |Kenneth Cattanach MacDonald
|align="center"  |North Okanagan<small>Coalition
||    
|-
||    
|align="center"  |John Henry Cates
|align="center"  |North Vancouver<small>Coalition
||    
|-
||    
|align="center"  |Herbert Anscomb
|align="center"  |Oak Bay<small>Coalition
||    
|-
||    
|align="center"  |William James Johnson
|align="center"  |Revelstoke<small>Coalition
||    
|-
||    
|align="center"  |James Lockhart Webster
|align="center"  |Rossland-Trail<small>Coalition
||    
|-
||    
|align="center"  |Norman William Whittaker
|align="center"  |Saanich<small>Coalition
||    
|-
||    
|align="center"  |Arthur Brown Ritchie
|align="center"  |Salmon Arm<small>Coalition
||    
|-
||    
|align="center"  |Reginald Robert Laird
|align="center"  |Similkameen<small>Coalition
||    
|-
||    
|align="center"  |Edward Tourtellotte Kenney
|align="center"  |Skeena<small>Coalition
||    
|-
||    
|align="center"  |William Andrew Cecil Bennett
|align="center"  |South Okanagan<small>Coalition
||    
|-
||    
|align="center"  |Donald Cameron Brown
|align="center" rowspan=2  |Vancouver-Burrard<small>Coalition
||    
|-
||    
|align="center"  |George Moir Weir
||    
|-
||    
|align="center"  |Allan James MacDonell
|align="center" rowspan=2  |Vancouver Centre<small>Coalition
||    
|-
||    
|align="center"  |Gordon Sylvester Wismer
||    
|-
||    
|align="center"  |Royal Lethington Maitland
|align="center" rowspan=3  |Vancouver-Point Grey<small>Coalition
||    
|-
||    
|align="center"  |James Alexander Paton
||    
|-
||    
|align="center"  |Tilly Rolston
||    
|-
||    
|align="center"  |John Hart
|align="center" rowspan=3  |Victoria City<small>Coalition
||    
|-
||    
|align="center"  |Nancy Hodges
||    
|-
||    
|align="center"  |William Thomas Straith
||    
|-
||    
|align="center"  |John Joseph Alban Gillis
|align="center"  |Yale<small>Coalition
||    
|-
|-
|
|align="center"|1  Premier-Elect and Incumbent
|
|
|
|
|-
|
|align="center"|2  Leader of the Opposition
|-
| align="center" colspan="10"|Source:''' Elections BC
|-
|}

See also
List of British Columbia political parties

1945
1945 elections in Canada
1945 in British Columbia
October 1945 events in Canada